Samaria is an unincorporated community in Hensley Township, Johnson County, Indiana.

History
Samaria was originally called Newburg and was platted as Newburg in 1852. The name was officially changed to Samaria in 1869. The community was named after the ancient city of Samaria.

Geography

References

Unincorporated communities in Johnson County, Indiana
Unincorporated communities in Indiana
Indianapolis metropolitan area